Barbara Stolz (née Dix on 28 June 1941) is a retired German gymnast. She competed at the 1964 Summer Olympics in all artistic gymnastics events and finished in fourth place with the German team. Her best individual result was 39th place in the uneven bars.

References

1941 births
Living people
German female artistic gymnasts
Gymnasts at the 1964 Summer Olympics
Olympic gymnasts of the United Team of Germany
People from Döbeln
Sportspeople from Saxony